Christopher K. Chase-Dunn (born January 10, 1944, Corvallis, Oregon) is an American sociologist best known for his contributions to world-systems theory.

Education and career
Chase-Dunn earned his PhD in 1975 at Stanford University (studying under John W. Meyer) and has taught at The Johns Hopkins University (1975–2000) and at the University of California, Riverside (2000–present). He is a Fellow of the American Association for the Advancement of Science and served as President (2002–06) of Research Committee 02 (Economy and Society) of the International Sociological Association from 2002 to 2006. He was chair of the Section on International Political Economy of the International Studies Association from 1984 to 1986, and chair of the Section on the Political Economy of the World-System of the American Sociological Association in 1982. He founded the Institute for Research on World-Systems at the University of California, Riverside. He is founding editor of the Journal of World-Systems Research, which is the official journal of the Political Economy of the World-System section of the American Sociological Association.

Publications
Chase-Dunn is the author, co-author, editor, or co-editor of over a dozen books, including most notably Global Formation: Structures of The World-Economy, a major theoretical synthesis and restatement of the world-systems approach to the study of social change.

Bibliography

 Global Formation: Structures of the World Economy. London, Oxford and New York: Basil Blackwell, 1999.
 Socialist States in the World System (ed.) Beverly Hills and London: Sage, 1982.
 Global Social Change. Historical and Comparative Perspectives (with S. B. Babones). Baltimore, Maryland: The Johns Hopkins University Press, 2006.
 Rise and Demise. Comparing World Systems (with Th. D. Hall). Boulder, Colorado: Westview Press, 1997.

References

External links
 Ch. Chase-Dunn is a member of Social Evolution & History journal

Living people
1944 births
World system scholars
American sociologists
Stanford University alumni
Johns Hopkins University faculty
University of California, Riverside faculty
Writers from Corvallis, Oregon
Writers about globalization